Iran Indika (born 30 June 1989) is a Sri Lankan cricketer. He made his first-class debut for Sri Lanka Army Sports Club in the 2015–16 Premier League Tournament on 15 January 2016.

References

External links
 

1989 births
Living people
Sri Lankan cricketers
Sri Lanka Army Sports Club cricketers